The Monday demonstrations were a series of peaceful political protests against the government of the German Democratic Republic (GDR) that took place in towns and cities around the country on various days of the week from 1989 to 1991. The Leipzig demonstrations, which are the most well known, took place on Mondays. The protests are conventionally separated into five cycles.

Overview 

Despite the policy of state atheism in East Germany, Christian pastor Christian Führer regularly met with his congregation at St. Nicholas Church in Leipzig for prayer since 1982. In Leipzig the demonstrations began on 4 September 1989 after the weekly  (prayer for peace) in the St. Nicholas Church with parson Christian Führer, and eventually filled the nearby Karl Marx Square (today known again as Augustusplatz). Safe in the knowledge that the Lutheran Church supported their resistance, many dissatisfied East German citizens gathered in the court of the church, and non-violent demonstrations began in order to demand rights such as the freedom to travel to foreign countries and to elect a democratic government. The location of the demonstration contributed to the success of the protests. Over the next seven years, the Church grew, despite authorities barricading the streets leading to it, and after church services, peaceful candlelit marches took place. The secret police issued death threats and even attacked some of the marchers, but the crowd still continued to gather.

Informed by West German television and friends about the events, people in other East German cities began replicating the Leipzig demonstrations, meeting at city squares in the evenings. A major turning point was precipitated by the events in the West German Embassy of Prague at the time. Thousands of East Germans had fled there in September, living  in conditions reminiscent of the Third World. Hans-Dietrich Genscher had negotiated an agreement that allowed them to travel to the West, using trains that had to first pass through the GDR. Genscher's speech from the balcony was interrupted by a very emotional reaction to his announcement. When the trains passed Dresden's central station in early October, police had to stop people from trying to jump on.

Protests around the 40th anniversary celebrations of the GDR on October 7 were met with a forceful response by the state. Despite the increased foreign attention around this date, there were around 3,500 arrests and many injured throughout East Germany.

Following the events of the weekend attention turned to Leipzig on Monday October 9. Seeing it as decision day, the State amassed 8000 police and armed military units with the intent of preventing any demonstrations. Fears of a "Chinese Solution" grew as rumours about hospitals stocking extra blood transfusions circulated. A message recorded by six prominent citizens was broadcast throughout the city, urging both sides to remain calm and strive for peaceful dialogue. Initiated by the respected conductor Kurt Masur the group also included local members of the communist party.

Expectations and preparations of the state were greatly exceeded as more than 70,000 protesters (out of the city's population of 500,000) assembled. The most famous chant became "" ("We are the people!"), reminding the leaders of the GDR that a democratic republic has to be ruled by the people, not by an undemocratic party claiming to represent them. Protesters remained completely peaceful as they reached the Stasi Headquarters, avoiding any escalation of the delicate situation.

Although some demonstrators were arrested, the threat of large-scale intervention by security forces never materialised as local leaders (SED party leader Helmut Hackenberg and Generalmajor Gerhard Straßenburg of the armed police), without precise orders from East Berlin and surprised by the unexpectedly high number of citizens, shied away from causing a possible massacre, ordering the retreat of their forces. Later, Egon Krenz claimed it was he who gave the order not to intervene.

October 9 is often seen as the "beginning of the end" of the GDR and one of the early signs of the state bowing to pressure. Since 2009 the date is commemorated and celebrated with the Festival of Lights drawing up to 200,000 people tracing the steps of the protest. Attendees include dignitaries like Kurt Masur, Hans-Dietrich Genscher, Joachim Gauck as well as Hungarian, Polish, Slovakian, Czech heads of state.

On 9 October 1989, the police and army units were given permission to use force against those assembled, but this did not deter the church service and march from taking place along the inner city ring road, which gathered 70,000 people.

The next week, in Leipzig on 16 October 1989, 120,000 demonstrators turned up, with military units again being held on stand-by in the vicinity. (Two days after the rally, Erich Honecker, the leader of the SED, was forced to resign.) The week after, the number more than doubled to 320,000. Many of those people started to cross into East Berlin, without a shot being fired. This pressure and other key events eventually led to the fall of the Berlin Wall on 9 November 1989, marking the imminent end of the socialist GDR regime.

The demonstrations eventually ended in March 1990, around the time of the first free multi-party elections for the Volkskammer parliament across the entire GDR. This paved the way to German reunification.

Cycles of the Monday Demonstrations in Leipzig
 First Cycle (25 September 1989 to 18  December 1989) Total of 13 protests.
 Second Cycle (8 January 1990 to 12 March 1990) Total of 10 protests.
  Third Cycle (10 September 1990 to 22 October 1990) Total of 7 protests.
 Fourth Cycle (21 January 1991 to 18 February 1991) Total of 5 protests.
 Fifth Cycle (4 March 1991 to 22 April 1991) Total of 7 protests.

Role of the church
During the rule of the GDR, the Church tried to retain its own autonomy and continue organizing, though the practice of religion was generally suppressed in keeping with the Marxist-Leninist doctrine of state atheism. During this period, the Church acted on their ideology of "work against injustice and oppression." As a result, the church offered sanctuary to alternative political groups, the victims of the GDR rule. The church also offered them financial aid, support from the congregation and a place to communicate.

Initially, the church did not make statements about the GDR or anything politically related. However, by the middle of 1989 there was a "politicization of the church." Politics started to appear in the sermon of the preachers. More and more people started to gather in the churches. This helped spread information about the injustices that were occurring in the state. The gathering of people after the peace prayers, and the spread of information, spurred the formation of spontaneous demonstrations.

See also

 Uprising of 1953 in East Germany
 Alexanderplatz demonstration
 Revolutions of 1989
 Peaceful Revolution
 History of the German Democratic Republic

Literature 
 Wolfgang Schneider et al. (Hrsg.): Leipziger Demontagebuch. Demo – Montag – Tagebuch – Demontage, Leipzig/Weimar: Gustav Kiepenheuer 1990
 Norbert Heber: Keine Gewalt! Der friedliche Weg zur Demokratie – eine Chronologie in Bildern, Berlin: Verbum 1990
 Jetzt oder nie – Demokratie. Leipziger Herbst 1989, Leipzig: C. Bertelsmann Verlag 1989
 Ekkehard Kuhn: Der Tag der Entscheidung. Leipzig, 9. Oktober 1989, Berlin: Ullstein 1992
 Karl Czok: Nikolaikirche – offen für alle. Eine Gemeinde im Zentrum der Wende, Leipzig: Evangelische Verlagsanstalt 1999
 Tobias Hollitzer: Der friedliche Verlauf des 9. Oktober 1989 in Leipzig – Kapitulation oder Reformbereitschaft? Vorgeschichte, Verlauf und Nachwirkung, in: Günther Heydemann, Gunther Mai und Werner Müller (Hrsg.) Revolution und Transformation in der DDR 1989/90, Berlin: Duncker & Humblot 1999, S. 247–288
 Martin Jankowski: "Rabet oder Das Verschwinden einer Himmelsrichtung". Roman. München: via verbis, 1999, 
 Thomas Küttler, Jean Curt Röder (Hrsg.): "Die Wende in Plauen", Plauen: Vogtländischer Heimatverlag Neupert Plauen 1991
 Martin Jankowski: Der Tag, der Deutschland veränderte - 9. Oktober 1989. Evangelische Verlagsanstalt, Leipzig 2007, 
 Schmemann, Serge, Upheaval in the East; Leipzig Marchers Tiptoe Around Reunification New York Times, December 19, 1989.

References

External links
 Chronik und Zeitzeugenberichte
 The Monday Walks of Leipzig - Visualization of the demonstrations
BBC-1 Nine O'Clock News reporting on the protests in Leipzig (10th October 1989)

Protests in Germany
Peaceful Revolution
Lutheran pacifists
History of East Germany
1989 in East Germany
1990 in East Germany
History of Lutheranism in Germany
Christian nonviolence
History of Leipzig
1989 in Christianity
1990 in Christianity
1989 in politics
1990 in politics